The Akroydon model housing scheme is a Victorian-era model village at Boothtown, Halifax, in the Metropolitan Borough of Calderdale in West Yorkshire, England.

As Scott's original plan to have dormer windows in the cottages was unacceptable to members of the Akroyd Town Building Association, Akroyd employed a local architect – W. H. Crossland – under the supervision of Scott, to come up with an acceptable design. The plan was for a quadrangular arrangement of 350 houses, but only 90 were actually built.

In the middle of the quadrangle, known as The Square, Akroyd had a monument called the Victoria Cross built in 1875 and dedicated to Queen Victoria. Its inscription includes a long quotation from William Wordsworth's poem The Excursion. The monument, similar in style to an Eleanor Cross, has been described as "a monument to the British constitution".

According to Walter L Creese, this "suburb on the moors" was Akroyd's attempt "to justify contemporary upheaval, to rationalize for himself and others the improvement and purpose of the factory system as it was replacing the cottage industries".

It was to be a model village not only in the architectural sense but also in a social sense, as the houses were built in various sizes for people from all economic classes, who were offered low cost mortgages to buy them. The village was to be managed by a committee of residents. There was a working men’s college for self-improvement.

Notable people
Eric Portman, stage and film actor, was born at 71 Chester Road, Akroydon, in 1901.

John Reginald Halliday Christie (the serial killer of 10, Rillington Place, London) was born in Northowram in 1899 and lived with his parents at Chester Road, Akroydon.

See also
Listed buildings in Halifax, West Yorkshire
All Souls' Church, Halifax
Bankfield Museum
Copley, West Yorkshire
Stewartby
Woodlands

Notes

References

Further reading

External links 
 Town Planning – A brief summary of some key dates and places and people, with links
 Timeline: Model Village

1859 establishments in England
Areas of Halifax, West Yorkshire
Model villages